Luiz Marenco (born December 22, 1964 in Porto Alegre) is a Brazilian folk musician and composer.

Discography
Luiz Marenco Canta Jayme Caetano Braun (1991)
Filosofia de Andejo (1993)
De a Cavalo (1994)
Luiz Marenco Canta Noel Guarany (1996)
Andarilho (1998)
Quando o Verso Vem Pras Casa (1999)
Luiz Marenco nos Festivais (1999)
Estâncias da Fronteira (1999)
Pra o Meu Consumo (2000)
Enchendo os Olhos de Campo (2001)
De Bota e Bombacha (2001)
O Melhor de Luiz Marenco (2001)
Luiz Marenco ao Vivo (2002)
De Campeiro Pra Campeiro (2002)

References

External links
Artist's website

1964 births
Living people
Brazilian composers
People from Porto Alegre
Musicians from Rio Grande do Sul
20th-century composers
20th-century Brazilian male singers
20th-century Brazilian singers
21st-century composers
21st-century Brazilian male singers
21st-century Brazilian singers